Charles Dewey (March 6, 1784 – April 25, 1862) was a justice of the Indiana Supreme Court from May 30, 1836, to January 29, 1847.

Born in Sheffield, Massachusetts, Dewey moved to Indiana "at an early day in its history". Dewey attended Williams College, and received an honorary LL.D. from Indiana University.

He became a leading lawyer in private practice in the state prior to his appointment to the state supreme court. Following his retirement from the bench, Dewey returned to private practice, though he was not thereafter active in public affairs.

After breaking his leg in a fall in his early seventies, Dewey largely withdrew from practice. He died at his home in Charlestown, Indiana at the age of 78, following a long illness.

References

External links

1784 births
1862 deaths
People from Sheffield, Massachusetts
Williams College alumni
Justices of the Indiana Supreme Court